Andrew Wylie (born 1947), known as The Jackal, is an American literary agent.

Early life
Wylie is the son of Craig Wylie (1908–1976), one time editor-in-chief at Houghton Mifflin, and Angela (1915–1989), daughter of the landscape architect and artist Robert Ludlow Fowler, Jr, of Oatlands, New York (son of judge Robert Ludlow Fowler, author of many legal texts). His grandfather, Yale-educated lawyer Horace Wylie, left his wife and children to marry the poet and novelist Elinor (née Hoyt), then Mrs Philip Simmons Hichborn, seventeen years his junior, causing a scandal; Horace was son of the federal judge Andrew Wylie and grandson of Rev. Andrew Wylie, first President of Indiana University.

Wylie grew up in Sudbury, Massachusetts, and attended St. Paul's School in Concord, New Hampshire, from which he was dismissed in 1965; an interview with his university alumni magazine stated that this was for arranging illicit excursions to Boston for fellow students and supplying them, illegally, with alcohol.

Poet
In 1972, Wylie published a short collection of poetry, Yellow Flowers. Many of the verses cited in public sources are sexually explicit in nature. In a 2007 interview, fellow agent Ira Silverberg suggested that Wylie has since attempted to acquire the remaining copies of the collection. Wylie himself denied this allegation, describing Yellow Flowers as a "youthful indiscretion".

Literary agent
Wylie founded the literary agency named after him in New York in 1980. He opened a second office in London in 1996. It now represents more than 1,000 clients and literary estates. For his business tactics, Wylie has been nicknamed "The Jackal".

Some of Wylie's clients include: 

Martin Amis
Alessandro Baricco
John Barth
The Donald Barthelme Estate
The Roberto Bolaño Estate
The Jorge Luis Borges Estate
The Guillermo Cabrera Infante Estate
The Italo Calvino Estate
The Albert Camus Estate
The Raymond Carver Estate
The John Cheever Estate
The Philip K. Dick Trust
The Yasunari Kawabata Estate
Karl Ove Knausgård
Milan Kundera
The Elmore Leonard Estate
The Arthur Miller Estate
The Vladimir Nabokov Literary Foundation
New York Review Books
The Patrick O'Brian Estate
Kenzaburo Oe
The Philip Roth Estate
Salman Rushdie
The José Saramago Estate
The W. G. Sebald Estate
Art Spiegelman
The Hunter S. Thompson Estate
The Tomasi di Lampedusa Estate
The John H. Updike Literary Trust
 The Kurt Vonnegut Estate
Mo Yan
The Evelyn Waugh Estate
The Andy Warhol Foundation
The C. V. Wedgwood Estate

Throughout his career as a literary agent, Wylie has attracted attention for poaching clients from other agents. In 1995 Martin Amis left his agent of 22 years, Pat Kavanagh, for Wylie, who was reported to have secured an advance of £500,000 for Amis's novel The Information.

In July 2010, Wylie launched a new business, Odyssey Editions, to publish e-books. The first twenty titles were launched on 21 July, available exclusively from Amazon.com. Wylie's friendly attitude towards Amazon was short-lived, though; in 2014 he advised: "If you have a choice between the plague and Amazon, pick the plague." He later went on to liken Amazon's tactics to those of the Islamic State.

References

External links
Corporate website
Victor Bockris and Andrew Wylie Collection at the Harry Ransom Center

1947 births
Harvard College alumni
Literary agents
Living people
St. Paul's School (New Hampshire) alumni